Braeburn Mombasa International School is a school in Mombasa, Kenya.

One of the Braeburn Schools, is a co-educational, multi-cultural, international weekly boarding school teaching the British National Curriculum to children from Early Years (nursery) up to and including A-Level (2-18 years). Situated on Kenya's coast at Bamburi, Mombasa - Malindi Road, off Cement Factory/Vescon Road, JCC Road, just north of Mombasa, the school has a  garden site.

External links
 

Schools in Mombasa
Boarding schools in Kenya
International schools in Kenya